Perittia passula is a moth of the family Elachistidae. It is found in California, United States.

The ground color of the forewings is light gray, densely mottled with dark gray tips of scales. The hindwings and underside of the wings are gray.

The larvae feed on Lonicera hispidula. They mine the leaves of their host plant. Pupation takes place in a dense cocoon, made under the epidermis of a twig of the host plant.

References

Moths described in 1995
Elachistidae
Moths of North America